The 2019 Croatian protests was an influx of movements and peaceful demonstrations in Zagreb, as part of a popular uprising against a surge in Violence against women and participated in rallies as part of the Spasime movement. The protests have been nicknamed the #Justice for Girls, #Save Me! Movement and #Me too! Movement.

Background
In Croatia, protesters were on the streets after a wave of Violence against women and injustice against young girls. Girls and women has suffered a history of violence in Croatia, so they called on Marches and Rallies to be held in public in protest.

Protests
Mass rallies was held in Zagreb on 16 March, in protest at violence against women. Thousands rallied in town squares and city-centres in streets for a day. Justice rallies and different street protests grew in late-October, when justice for girls rallies were taking place across Zagreb at protest against violence.

See also
 2011 Croatian protests

References

Protests in Croatia
Protests in the European Union
2019 protests